In Japanese mythology,  is the traditional and legendary history of the emergence of the Japanese archipelago, of islands, as narrated in the Kojiki and Nihon Shoki. According to this legend, after the creation of Heaven and Earth, the gods Izanagi and Izanami were given the task of forming a series of islands that would become what is now Japan. In Japanese mythology, these islands make up the known world. The creation of Japan is followed by the creation of the gods (kamiumi).

Creation story

According to the Kojiki
After the formation, Heaven was above and Earth was still a drifting soft mush. The first five gods named  were lone deities without sex and did not reproduce. The elder gods delegated the youngest couple Izanagi and Izanami to carry out their venerable mandate: to reach down from heaven and give solid form to the earth.

This they did with the use of a precious stone-covered spear named , given to them by the elders. When drops of salty water fell from the tip, they formed into the first island, Onogoroshima.

Then they initiated conversation inquiring of each other's anatomy, leading to a mutual decision to mate and reproduce:

Izanami accepted the offer and Izanagi proposed that both should circle around the column Ame-no-mihashira in opposite directions, Izanami going right and Izanagi left and on meeting each other would perform sexual intercourse. However, when they met on the other side of the pillar, Izanami was the first to speak, saying: "Oh, indeed you are a beautiful and kind youth!", to which Izanagi replied: "Oh, what a most beautiful and kind youth!". Izanagi then rebukes Izanami saying: "It is wrong for the wife to speak first.".

However, they mated anyway and later fathered a child Hiruko (lit. "leech child), who was placed in a reed boat dragged by the current. Neither Hiruko nor Awashima were considered legitimate children of Izanagi and Izanami.

Izanagi and Izanami decided to ascend to heaven and consult the primordial gods at Takamagahara about the ill-formed children that resulted from their union. The gods determined through divination that the female speaking first during the ceremony was the cause. So the couple returned to Onogoroshima island and repeated the rite encircling the column, only making sure Izanagi was the first to speak out in greeting. When finished, they performed the union successfully and lands began to be born.

Birth of the islands
According to the legend, the formation of Japan began with the creation of eight large islands by Izanagi and Izanami. In order of birth these islands are the following:

 : currently, Awaji Island;
 : currently, Shikoku. This island had a body and four faces. The names of the faces are as follows:
 : Iyo Province;
 : Sanuki Province;
 : Awa Province;
 : Tosa Province.
 : today, Oki Islands. Dubbed ;
 : today, Kyūshū. This island had a body and four faces. The names of the faces are as follows:
 : Tsukushi Province;
 : Toyo Province;
 : Hi Province;
 : Kumaso.
 : today, Iki Island. Dubbed ;
 : today, Tsushima Island. Dubbed ;
 : today, Sado Island;
 : today, Honshu.  Dubbed .

Traditionally these islands are known as Ōyashima (lit. eight large islands) and as a whole are what is currently known as Japan. In the myth neither Hokkaidō nor the Ryukyu Islands are mentioned as these were not known to the Japanese at the time of compiling the Kojiki.

Additionally, Izanagi and Izanami then gave birth to six islands:
 :  of Kibi (now in Okayama). Dubbed ;
 : Shōdoshima. Dubbed ;
 : Suō-Ōshima. Dubbed ;
 : Himeshima. Dubbed ;
 : Gotō Islands. Dubbed ;
 : Danjo Islands. Dubbed .

According to the Nihon Shoki
The story of this book only differs in that Izanagi and Izanami volunteered to consolidate the earth. In addition, the two deities are described as "god of yang" (陽神 youshin, male deity) and "goddess of yin" (陰神 inshin, female deity) influenced by the ideas of Yin and yang. The rest of the story is identical, except that the other celestial gods (Kotoamatsukami) do not appear, nor are the last six smaller islands mentioned that were born through Izanagi and Izanami.

Notes

References

Bibliography

Japanese mythology
Creation myths